Roger G. Walker, FRSC, MMR is a geologist and an award-winning emeritus professor at McMaster University.

Walker obtained his D.Phil. from Oxford University. He was a postdoctoral fellow at Johns Hopkins University. For 32 years, he taught at McMaster University. In 1998, Walker left McMaster to be a consultant in Calgary.

In 2013, Walker achieved the title of Master Model Railroader from the National Model Railroad Association.

Honours
 made a Fellow of the Royal Society of Canada
 made an honorary member of Society of Sedimentary Geology

Awards
 1975, awarded the Past Presidents' Medal by the Geological Association of Canada
 1990, awarded the R. J. W. Douglas Medal by the Canadian Society of Petroleum Geologists
 1999, awarded the Logan Medal by the Geological Association of Canada
 awarded the Francis J. Pettijohn Medal by the Society of Sedimentary Geology
 awarded the Henry Clifton Sorby Medal by the International Association of Sedimentologists
 awarded the Distinguished Educator Award by the American Association of Petroleum Geologists

References

Alumni of St John's College, Oxford
Canadian geologists
Johns Hopkins University fellows
Fellows of the Royal Society of Canada
Academic staff of McMaster University
Logan Medal recipients
Year of birth missing (living people)
Living people